Serxhio Mukja (born 15 November 1996) is an Albanian professional footballer who plays as a midfielder.

International career

Albania U17
Mukja received his first Albania under-17 call-up by manager Džemal Mustedanagić for a friendly tournament developed in August 2012 in Romania.

Career statistics

Club

References

External links
Serxhio Mukja profile at FSHF.org

1996 births
Living people
Footballers from Elbasan
Albanian footballers
Association football midfielders
Kategoria e Parë players
Kategoria Superiore players
KF Elbasani players
Besa Kavajë players
Albania youth international footballers